Ben Motshwari (born 21 March 1991) is a South African professional soccer player who plays as a midfielder for Orlando Pirates and the South Africa national team.

Professional career
Motshwari made his professional debut with Bidvest Wits in a 3–0 South African Premier Division win over Moroka Swallows F.C. on 29 August 2014. He signed with Orlando Pirates in 2018.

International career
Motshwari debuted with the South Africa national team in a 1–1 2021 Africa Cup of Nations qualification tie with Ghana on 25 March 2021.

References

External links
 
 

1991 births
Living people
Sportspeople from Gauteng
South African soccer players
South Africa international soccer players
Association football midfielders
Bidvest Wits F.C. players
Orlando Pirates F.C. players
South African Premier Division players